The women's heptathlon event at the 2017 Asian Athletics Championships was held on 8 and 9 July.

Medalists

Results

100 metres hurdles

High jump

Shot put

200 metres

Long jump

Javelin throw

800 metres

Final standings

References

Heptathlon
Combined events at the Asian Athletics Championships